Michael Scott Kirkman (born September 18, 1986) is an American former professional baseball pitcher. He played in Major League Baseball (MLB) for the Texas Rangers, San Diego Padres and Milwaukee Brewers.

Early life
Prior to playing professionally, he attended Columbia High School in Lake City, Florida. He was drafted by the Rangers in the fifth round of the 2005 amateur draft and began his professional career that year.

Professional career

Texas Rangers
With the AZL Rangers in 2005, Kirkman went 3–1 with a 3.44 ERA in 14 games (nine starts), striking out 58 batters in 52 innings. He split 2006 between the AZL Rangers (eight games) and Clinton LumberKings (six games), going a combined 1–5 with a 9.70 ERA in 14 games (10 starts). He walked 51 batters in 34 innings while striking out 30. Despite posting an ERA near ten, he did not allow a single home run in 2006.

Kirkman pitched for the LumberKings (five games) and Spokane Indians (nine games) in 2007, going a combined 1–5 with a 7.14 ERA in 14 games (eight starts). He pitched for Spokane and Clinton again in 2008, improving to a combined record of 5–4 with an ERA of 3.84 in 17 games (16 starts).

2009 became a breakout year for Kirkman. In eight Bakersfield Blaze games Kirkman threw 48 innings with  a 2.06 ERA, striking out 54 and issued 18 walks. Kirkman was promoted to AA Frisco, threw 96 innings in 18 games and earned a spot on the 40_man roster after the 2009 season. In an interview with Jason Cole, Kirkman attributed his 2009 improvement to watching film of Cliff Lee. 

He began 2010 with the Oklahoma City RedHawks and was ranked as the 15th best prospect at the start of the year by Jamey Newberg. In his major league debut with the Rangers on August 21, he struck out the first three batters he faced and retired all four.

After beginning the 2011 season with the Rangers, Kirkman was optioned to Triple-A on April 20.

On May 21, 2012, the Rangers announced that Kirkman was being treated for skin cancer.

Kirkman started the 2013 season with the Rangers until June 9 when he was placed on the 15-day disabled list, due to a reoccurrence of the skin cancer. He was designated for assignment on March 28, 2014 and outrighted to the minors four days later. He was called back up by the Rangers on September 2, 2014.

He was non-tendered on December 2, 2014 and became a free agent. He was later resigned, then released on March 17, 2015.

Milwaukee Brewers
On April 22, 2015, Kirkman signed a minor league contract with the Milwaukee Brewers. He was released on August 1.

San Diego Padres
After signing a minor league deal with San Diego in February 2016, Kirkman was called up to the majors on April 26. He was designated for assignment on May 2.

Return to Milwaukee
On May 5, 2016, Kirkman was claimed off waivers by the Milwaukee Brewers. He was designated for assignment on May 13, 2016, to make room for waiver claim Jhan Marinez.

Atlanta Braves
The Atlanta Braves signed Kirkman to a minor league contract on January 31, 2017. He was released on March 29, 2017.

References

External links

1986 births
Living people
People from Lake City, Florida
Baseball players from Florida
Major League Baseball pitchers
Texas Rangers players
San Diego Padres players
Milwaukee Brewers players
Arizona League Rangers players
Clinton LumberKings players
Spokane Indians players
Bakersfield Blaze players
Frisco RoughRiders players
Oklahoma City RedHawks players
Round Rock Express players
Colorado Springs Sky Sox players
El Paso Chihuahuas players